Sector 79

is residential sector located in Mohali, Punjab famous for Ivy Hospital. It is covered with Mattaur, Sector 72, 70, Sohana, Sector 60 and Sector 76, Mohali.

Facilities
 Pracheen Kala Kendra
 LeOrion Observatory
 Kargil Park
 GMADA Sports Complex
 Community Center

Healthcare
 Ivy Hospital

Banks
 Bank of Baroda

Education
 Paragon Senior Secondary School
 Saint Xaviers Public School

Religious
 Gurdwara Sector 71
 Chandi Mandir
 Shiv Narain Mandir, Mattaur
 Noorani Masjid, Mattaur

Access
Sector 71 is situated on Himalaya Marg, on Chandigarh-Sohana road and Mohali Bypass road. It is well connected with road, rail and air. The nearest airports are Chandigarh Airport and railway station at Industrial Area - Phase 9. It is entry point from all sides of Punjab towards Mohali Bus Stand. Auto rickshaw are easily available for commuting. A few CTU local buses also available connecting PGI and Landran.

LeOrion Observatory 
The name LeOrion is derived from the two main constellations Leo and Orion. LeOrion serves the astronomical events, lunar and planetary observations to the public. The stellar observations are done for spectrum analysis. The observatory is located 30° 42' 21.31'' N, 76° 42' 23.95'' E.

The observatory consists of Meade LX-90ACF 12-inches telescope. The observatory is under the private control since 26 September 2016 and will soon be open to public and amateur astronomers of North India. The main focus of the observatory is to capture the spectrum of the binary stars, planetary nebula, supernova remnant, comets, red/blue shifts and stars having visual magnitude greater than +6.5(not visible to naked eye). The observatory is controlled by Amrinderjit Singh.

References

Mohali
Sectors of Mohali